Sureswari temple or Sursuri temple is located at the left bank of Tel River towards the south-west of the confluence of Mahanadi and Tel River. This temple is located in the temple town of Sonepur, Subarnapur district, Odisha, India. The presiding deity is maa Sursuri, and it is well known as one of the oldest Shakti shrine. In western part of odisha maximum people  devote of Maa sursuri 
The word Sureswari is the sanskritised version of Sursuri.

See also 
 Subarnameru Temple
 Kosaleswara Temple
 Lankeswari Temple
 Patali Srikhetra

References

External links 
 Temples in Sonepur

Shakti temples
 
Hindu temples in Subarnapur district